Thomas Luttrell may refer to:

 Thomas Luttrell (died 1571), English politician from Dunster Castle, Member of Parliament (MP) for Minehead 1563
 Thomas Luttrell (1583–1644) (1583–1644), English politician from Dunster Castle, MP for Minehead 1625
 Sir Thomas Luttrell (Irish judge) (died 1554), Anglo Irish lawyer, Chief Justice of Common Pleas, Solicitor General
 Thomas Fownes Luttrell (1763–1811) from Dunster Castle, English officer in the British Army, MP for Minehead 1795–96

See also 
 Feudal barony of Dunster